Michael Green (born May 5, 1972 in Braunschweig, Lower Saxony) is a former field hockey player from Germany. He began his career at MTV Braunschweig and Braunschweiger THC and later played for Harvestehuder THC in Hamburg. The defender competed at two Summer Olympics. Green is working as a surgeon, and played more than 260 international matches for the German field hockey squad.

List of Honours
 1992 – Best Player at the 1992 Junior European Championship
 1996 – Best Player in the German National League
 1996 – Sportsman of Hamburg
 1999 – Best Player in the German National League
 2002 – FIH Player of the Year

International Senior Tournaments
 1993 – Champions Trophy, Kuala Lumpur (2nd place)
 1994 – Champions Trophy, Lahore (2nd place)
 1994 – World Cup, Sydney (4th place)
 1995 – European Nations Cup, Dublin (1st place)
 1995 – Champions Trophy, Berlin (1st place)
 1996 – 1996 Summer Olympics, Atlanta (4th place)
 1996 – Champions Trophy, Madras (3rd place)
 1997 – Champions Trophy, Adelaide (1st place)
 1998 – World Cup, Utrecht (3rd place)
 1998 – Champions Trophy, Lahore (6th place)
 1999 – European Nations Cup, Padova (1st place)
 2000 – Champions Trophy, Amstelveen (2nd place)
 2000 – 2000 Summer Olympics, Sydney (5th place)
 2001 – European Indoor Nations Cup, Luzern (1st place)
 2001 – Champions Trophy, Rotterdam (1st place)
 2002 – World Cup, Kuala Lumpur (1st place)
 2003 – European Nations Cup, Barcelona (1st place)

References

External links
 
sports-reference

1972 births
Living people
German male field hockey players
Male field hockey defenders
Olympic field hockey players of Germany
Field hockey players at the 1996 Summer Olympics
Field hockey players at the 2000 Summer Olympics
Sportspeople from Braunschweig
1998 Men's Hockey World Cup players
2002 Men's Hockey World Cup players
Harvestehuder THC players